Carl Aaron Swensson (June 25, 1857 – February 16, 1904) was an American Lutheran minister and founder and President of Bethany College.

Background
Carl Aaron Swensson was born at Chandler's Valley near Sugar Grove, Pennsylvania. He was a son of Jonas and Maria (Blixt) Swensson and the eldest in a family of seven children. His parents came to America in 1856 from Småland, Sweden. His father, Jonas Swensson, a minister of the Swedish Lutheran Church, was president of the Augustana Synod of the Swedish Lutheran churches in America.

As a youth he attended a parochial school at Andover, Illinois. He graduated with the class of 1877 from Augustana College at Rock Island, Illinois. The same year, he entered the Theological Seminary and was graduated in June 1879.  He was ordained as a minister of the Swedish Lutheran Church of the Augustana Synod on June 22, 1879.

Career
Dr. Swensson accepted a call from the Swedish Lutheran Church at Lindsborg, Kansas. He succeeded Rev. Dr. Olof Olsson, Lindsborg's Swedish immigrant pioneer leader who later became President of the Augustana College in Rock Island, Illinois. Bethany College was founded in the sacristy of Bethany Lutheran Church on October 15, 1881.

Dr. Swensson received his A. M. from Augustana College in 1889; his Ph. D. from the University of Upsala, in 1893; his D. D. from Thiel College, Greenville, Pennsylvania, and from Augustana College, Rock Island, Illinois. He was decorated with the order of "Knights of the North Star" by King Oscar II of Sweden in 1901. He served as secretary of the General Council of the Lutheran Church of North America in 1885, and its president from 1893–1894. He was a member of the Kansas Legislature 1889–1890, having been elected to the Kansas House of Representatives. He was a delegate to the Republican Convention during 1896. He was president of the Kansas Teachers' Association 1889–1890. He was a member of the State Historical Society and of American Academy of Political and Social Science at the World's Columbian Exhibition in 1893. He was a member of the Building Committee for Sweden's Building at the St. Louis Exposition in 1904.

Traveling extensively throughout America, Dr. Swensson was a popular orator, writer and author.  He was  an author of  devotional books In the Morning Hour (Swedish:I Morgonstund) and  By the Fireside as well as of several books of travel in Swedish and English. He was also editor of and contributor to church and secular papers. Dr. Swensson's books and other writings were popular in Sweden and several times he traveled there. A  marble statue of Dr. Swensson is displayed prominently on the Bethany College campus.

References

Sources
Olson, Ernst W. and Martin J. Engberg  History of the Swedes in Illinois – In Three Parts; Part I: History of the Swedes of Illinois, Part II: Biographical Sketches with Portraits – Chicago, & Part III: Biographical Sketches with Portraits – Counties at Large  ( Engberg-Holmberg Publishing Company, Chicago: 1908)
Pearson, Daniel Merle The Americanization of Carl Aaron Swensson (Augustana Historical Society. 1977)

Other reading
Swensson, Carl Aaron  The Swedes in Kansas: A paper written by President C.A. Swensson, of Bethany College, Lindsborg, for the annual meeting of the State Historical Society, January 17, 1888 (Kansas State Historical Society. 1890)
Granquist, Mark and Maria Erling The Augustana Story: Shaping Lutheran Identity in North America (Augsburg Fortress Publishers.  2008)

External links
Carl Aaron Swensson statue

American people of Swedish descent
19th-century American Lutheran clergy
Augustana College (Illinois) alumni
Heads of universities and colleges in the United States
Republican Party members of the Kansas House of Representatives
Bethany College (Kansas)
People from Warren County, Pennsylvania
1857 births
1904 deaths
19th-century American politicians